The Novation X-Station is a virtual analog synthesizer, audio interface and MIDI controller that was released in early 2004, and made by the British company Novation. It is the end-result of adding an audio interface, a KS-class synthesizer and an effects section to the company's ReMOTE controllers. The product was sold for a short time under the name ReMOTE Audio, before being re-branded as the X-Station. It came in three variants  : 25, 49 and 61 keys (2,4 and 5 octaves, respectively). 

The Novation X-Station uses a unique process that manipulates algorithms, called "Liquid Analogue Sound Modelling" a technique that mimics the subtle distortions introduced at the filter stage by analog synthesis, originally developed by Novation for their classic synth, the Supernova. You could call the synthesizer of the X-Station "Supernova Light".

The audio interface is 24 bits, with 2 phantom powered XLR/Jack inputs, and S/PDIF out. It also has an assignable 'Xpression' pad and spring-loaded X/Y joystick. The X-Station can be powered by USB, rechargeable batteries, or power adaptor. 

The Novation X-Station was discontinued May, 2009.

External links 
 Novation X-Station official product page

Virtual analog synthesizers
Novation synthesizers